Genuine Diamond is the tenth studio album by the Japanese hard rock band Show-Ya. It was released on March 7, 2012 and is the first studio album recorded with the original line-up since Hard Way of 1990, 22 years before.

The song "Fairy" from their album Ways of 1986 was re-recorded for this album.

Track listing
"Bloody Rose – Bara no Monshō" (Bloody Rose ～薔薇の紋章～) (Keiko Terada, Yoshihiko Andō) – 3:27
"Outsider" (Terada & Miki Nakamura, Andō) – 4:56
"Ryūseishōjo - Shooting Star 196X" (流星少女～Shooting Star 196X～) (Satomi Senba & Miki Tsunoda, Andō) – 4:08
"Iki Ga Dekinai Hodo" (息ができないほど) (Terada, Yukinojō Mori) – 5:17
"Count8" (Senba & Tsunoda) – 3:11
"Get My Beat" (Terada, Andō) – 4:08
"Life with You" (Terada) – 6:12
"Sei – Saga" ( 性 ～Saga～) (Terada, Andō) – 4:53
"Survivor" (Terada, Andō) – 4:02
"Rolling Planet" (Miki Igarashi, Mori) – 4:36
"In My Arms" (Terada, Mori) – 4:36
"Fairy" (Igarashi, Terada) – 4:01

Personnel

Band members
Keiko Terada – vocals
Miki Igarashi – guitars
Miki Nakamura – keyboards
Satomi Senba – bass
Miki Tsunoda – drums

References

External links
Show-Ya discography 

2012 albums
Show-Ya albums
Japanese-language albums